The following is a partial list of the "D" codes for Medical Subject Headings (MeSH), as defined by the United States National Library of Medicine (NLM).

This list covers blood proteins. For other protein-related codes, see List of MeSH codes (D12.776).

Codes before these are found at List of MeSH codes (D12.776.097). Codes following these are found at List of MeSH codes (D12.776.157). For other MeSH codes, see List of MeSH codes.

The source for this content is the set of 2006 MeSH Trees from the NLM.

– blood proteins

– acute-phase proteins

– alpha 1-antichymotrypsin

– alpha 1-antitrypsin

– alpha-macroglobulins

– c-reactive protein

– ceruloplasmin

– complement c3

– fibrinogen
 – fibrinogens, abnormal

– haptoglobins

– hemopexin

– orosomucoid

– serum albumin

– serum amyloid a protein

– serum amyloid p-component

– transferrin

– trypsin inhibitor, kazal pancreatic

– ankyrins

– anion exchange protein 1, erythrocyte

– blood coagulation factors

– beta-thromboglobulin

– factor v
 – factor va

– factor vii
 – factor viia

– factor viii
 – factor viiia

– factor ix
 – factor ixa

– factor x
 – factor xa

– factor xi
 – factor xia

– factor xii
 – factor xiia

– factor xiii
 – factor xiiia

– fibrinogen
 – fibrinogens, abnormal

– fibrinopeptide a

– fibrinopeptide b

– kallikreins
 – prekallikrein

– kininogens
 – kininogen, high-molecular-weight
 – kininogen, low-molecular-weight

– plasminogen activator inhibitor 1

– plasminogen activator inhibitor 2

– plasminogen activators
 – streptokinase
 – anistreplase
 – streptodornase and streptokinase
 – tissue plasminogen activator
 – urinary plasminogen activator

– platelet factor 3

– platelet factor 4

– prothrombin

– thrombin

– thromboplastin

– von willebrand factor

– fibrin

– fibrin fibrinogen degradation products

– fibrin foam

– fibrin tissue adhesive

– fibrinopeptide a

– fibrinopeptide b

– glycophorin

– hemocyanin

– hemoglobins

– carboxyhemoglobin

– erythrocruorins

– fetal hemoglobin

– globins

– hemoglobin a
 – hemoglobin a, glycosylated
 – hemoglobin a2

– hemoglobins, abnormal
 – hemoglobin c
 – hemoglobin e
 – hemoglobin h
 – hemoglobin j
 – hemoglobin m
 – hemoglobin, sickle

– methemoglobin

– oxyhemoglobins

– sulfhemoglobin

– immunoproteins

– c-reactive protein

– complement system proteins
 – anaphylatoxins
 – complement c3a
 – complement c4a
 – complement c5a
 – complement c5a, des-arginine
 – complement c1
 – complement c1q
 – complement c1r
 – complement c1s
 – complement c2
 – complement c2a
 – complement c2b
 – complement c3
 – complement c3a
 – complement c3b
 – complement c3c
 – complement c3d
 – complement c4
 – complement c4a
 – complement c4b
 – complement c5
 – complement c5a
 – complement c5a, des-arginine
 – complement c5b
 – complement c6
 – complement c7
 – complement c8
 – complement c9
 – complement activating enzymes
 – complement c1r
 – complement c1s
 – complement c3-c5 convertases
 – complement c3-c5 convertases, alternative pathway
 – complement c3 convertase, alternative pathway
 – complement c5 convertase, alternative pathway
 – complement c3-c5 convertases, classical pathway
 – complement c3 convertase, classical pathway
 – complement c5 convertase, classical pathway
 – mannose-binding protein-associated serine proteases
 – complement factor d
 – complement factor b
 – complement inactivator proteins
 – antigens, cd46
 – complement c1 inactivator proteins
 – complement c1 inhibitor protein
 – complement c3 nephritic factor
 – complement c3b inactivator proteins
 – complement factor h
 – complement factor i
 – complement c4b-binding protein
 – complement membrane attack complex
 – properdin

– eosinophil granule proteins
 – eosinophil cationic protein
 – eosinophil-derived neurotoxin
 – eosinophil peroxidase
 – eosinophil major basic protein

– immunoglobulins
 – antibodies
 – antibodies, anti-idiotypic
 – antibodies, archaeal
 – antibodies, bacterial
 – antistreptolysin
 – antibodies, bispecific
 – antibodies, blocking
 – antibodies, catalytic
 – antibodies, fungal
 – antibodies, helminth
 – antibodies, heterophile
 – antibodies, monoclonal
 – muromonab-cd3
 – antibodies, neoplasm
 – antibodies, phospho-specific
 – antibodies, protozoan
 – antibodies, viral
 – deltaretrovirus antibodies
 – hiv antibodies
 – htlv-i antibodies
 – htlv-ii antibodies
 – hepatitis antibodies
 – hepatitis a antibodies
 – hepatitis b antibodies
 – hepatitis c antibodies
 – antigen-antibody complex
 – antitoxins
 – antivenins
 – botulinum antitoxin
 – diphtheria antitoxin
 – tetanus antitoxin
 – autoantibodies
 – antibodies, antineutrophil cytoplasmic
 – antibodies, antinuclear
 – antibodies, antiphospholipid
 – antibodies, anticardiolipin
 – lupus coagulation inhibitor
 – complement c3 nephritic factor
 – immunoconglutinins
 – immunoglobulins, thyroid-stimulating
 – long-acting thyroid stimulator
 – rheumatoid factor
 – binding sites, antibody
 – complementarity determining regions
 – hemolysins
 – immune sera
 – antilymphocyte serum
 – antitoxins
 – antivenins
 – botulinum antitoxin
 – diphtheria antitoxin
 – tetanus antitoxin
 – immunoconjugates
 – immunotoxins
 – immunoglobulin allotypes
 – immunoglobulin gm allotypes
 – immunoglobulin km allotypes
 – immunoglobulin isotypes
 – immunoglobulin a
 – immunoglobulin a, secretory
 – secretory component
 – immunoglobulin alpha-chains
 – immunoglobulin d
 – immunoglobulin delta-chains
 – immunoglobulin e
 – immunoglobulin epsilon-chains
 – immunoglobulin g
 – immunoglobulin gamma-chains
 – immunoglobulin gm allotypes
 – immunoglobulins, intravenous
 – long-acting thyroid stimulator
 – muromonab-cd3
 – rho(d) immune globulin
 – immunoglobulin m
 – immunoglobulin mu-chains
 – immunoglobulins, intravenous
 – immunoglobulins, thyroid-stimulating
 – insulin antibodies
 – isoantibodies
 – oligoclonal bands
 – opsonin proteins
 – plantibodies
 – precipitins
 – reagins
 – gamma-globulins
 – tuftsin
 – immunoglobulin constant regions
 – immunoglobulin fab fragments
 – immunoglobulin fc fragments
 – cd4 immunoadhesins
 – immunoglobulin fragments
 – immunoglobulin fab fragments
 – immunoglobulin variable region
 – complementarity determining regions
 – immunoglobulin joining region
 – tuftsin
 – immunoglobulin fc fragments
 – cd4 immunoadhesins
 – immunoglobulin constant regions
 – immunoglobulin idiotypes
 – immunoglobulin subunits
 – immunoglobulin heavy chains
 – immunoglobulin alpha-chains
 – immunoglobulin delta-chains
 – immunoglobulin epsilon-chains
 – immunoglobulin gamma-chains
 – immunoglobulin gm allotypes
 – immunoglobulin mu-chains
 – immunoglobulin j-chains
 – immunoglobulin light chains
 – immunoglobulin kappa-chains
 – immunoglobulin km allotypes
 – immunoglobulin lambda-chains
 – secretory component
 – immunoglobulin variable region
 – complementarity determining regions
 – immunoglobulin fab fragments
 – immunoglobulin joining region
 – paraproteins
 – bence jones protein
 – cryoglobulins
 – myeloma proteins
 – pyroglobulins
 – receptors, antigen, b-cell
 – antigens, cd79

– opsonin proteins

– properdin

– platelet-derived growth factor

– proto-oncogene proteins c-sis

– protein c

– protein s

– serum albumin

– methemalbumin

– prealbumin

– serum albumin, bovine

– serum albumin, radio-iodinated

– serum globulins

– alpha-globulins
 – alpha 1-antichymotrypsin
 – alpha 1-antitrypsin
 – alpha-macroglobulins
 – antiplasmin
 – antithrombin iii
 – ceruloplasmin
 – haptoglobins
 – heparin cofactor ii
 – orosomucoid
 – progesterone-binding globulin
 – retinol-binding proteins
 – transcortin

– beta-globulins
 – beta-2 microglobulin
 – beta-thromboglobulin
 – complement factor h
 – hemopexin
 – plasminogen
 – angiostatins
 – properdin
 – sex hormone-binding globulin
 – transferrin

– immunoglobulins

– antibodies
 – antibodies, anti-idiotypic
 – antibodies, archaeal
 – antibodies, bacterial
 – antistreptolysin
 – antibodies, bispecific
 – antibodies, blocking
 – antibodies, catalytic
 – antibodies, fungal
 – antibodies, helminth
 – antibodies, heterophile
 – antibodies, monoclonal
 – muromonab-cd3
 – antibodies, neoplasm
 – antibodies, phospho-specific
 – antibodies, protozoan
 – antibodies, viral
 – deltaretrovirus antibodies
 – hiv antibodies
 – htlv-i antibodies
 – htlv-ii antibodies
 – hepatitis antibodies
 – hepatitis a antibodies
 – hepatitis b antibodies
 – hepatitis c antibodies
 – antigen-antibody complex
 – antitoxins
 – antivenins
 – botulinum antitoxin
 – diphtheria antitoxin
 – tetanus antitoxin
 – autoantibodies
 – antibodies, antineutrophil cytoplasmic
 – antibodies, antinuclear
 – antibodies, antiphospholipid
 – antibodies, anticardiolipin
 – lupus coagulation inhibitor
 – complement c3 nephritic factor
 – immunoconglutinins
 – immunoglobulins, thyroid-stimulating
 – long-acting thyroid stimulator
 – rheumatoid factor
 – binding sites, antibody
 – complementarity determining regions
 – hemolysins
 – immune sera
 – antilymphocyte serum
 – immunoconjugates
 – immunotoxins
 – immunoglobulin allotypes
 – immunoglobulin gm allotypes
 – immunoglobulin km allotypes
 – immunoglobulin isotypes
 – immunoglobulin a
 – immunoglobulin a, secretory
 – secretory component
 – immunoglobulin alpha-chains
 – immunoglobulin d
 – immunoglobulin delta-chains
 – immunoglobulin e
 – immunoglobulin epsilon-chains
 – immunoglobulin g
 – immunoglobulin gamma-chains
 – immunoglobulin gm allotypes
 – long-acting thyroid stimulator
 – muromonab-cd3
 – rho(d) immune globulin
 – immunoglobulin m
 – immunoglobulin mu-chains
 – immunoglobulins, intravenous
 – immunoglobulins, thyroid-stimulating
 – insulin antibodies
 – isoantibodies
 – oligoclonal bands
 – opsonin proteins
 – plantibodies
 – precipitins
 – reagins

– gamma-globulins
 – tuftsin

– immunoglobulin constant regions
 – immunoglobulin fab fragments
 – immunoglobulin fc fragments
 – cd4 immunoadhesins

– immunoglobulin fragments
 – immunoglobulin fab fragments
 – immunoglobulin variable region
 – complementarity determining regions
 – immunoglobulin joining region
 – tuftsin
 – immunoglobulin fc fragments
 – cd4 immunoadhesins
 – immunoglobulin constant regions
 – immunoglobulin idiotypes

– immunoglobulin subunits
 – immunoglobulin heavy chains
 – immunoglobulin alpha-chains
 – immunoglobulin delta-chains
 – immunoglobulin epsilon-chains
 – immunoglobulin gamma-chains
 – immunoglobulin gm allotypes
 – immunoglobulin mu-chains
 – immunoglobulin j-chains
 – immunoglobulin light chains
 – immunoglobulin kappa-chains
 – immunoglobulin km allotypes
 – immunoglobulin lambda-chains
 – secretory component

– immunoglobulin variable region
 – complementarity determining regions
 – immunoglobulin fab fragments
 – immunoglobulin joining region

– paraproteins
 – bence jones protein
 – cryoglobulins
 – myeloma proteins
 – pyroglobulins

– receptors, antigen, b-cell
 – antigens, cd79

– macroglobulins
 – alpha-macroglobulins
 – pregnancy-associated alpha 2-macroglobulins

– transcobalamins

– somatomedins

– insulin-like growth factor i

– insulin-like growth factor ii

– nonsuppressible insulin-like activity

– spectrin

– thyroxine-binding proteins

– tumor necrosis factor-alpha

– vitronectin

The list continues at List of MeSH codes (D12.776.157).

D12.776.124
Proteins
Protein classification